Auberjonois is a surname originating from Romandy. Notable people with this surname include the following:

 Fernand Auberjonois (1910–2004), American journalist who worked as the foreign correspondent of the Pittsburgh Post-Gazette and the Toledo Blade
 Remy Auberjonois (born 1974), actor; son of actor René Auberjonois
 René Auberjonois (1940–2019), American character actor
 René Auberjonois (painter) (1872–1957), Swiss painter

French-language surnames
Swiss-French people